The 2018–19 Egyptian Premier League, also known as The WE League for sponsorship purposes, was the 60th season of the Egyptian Premier League, the top Egyptian professional league for association football clubs, since its establishment in 1948. The season started on 31 July 2018 and concluded on 28 July 2019. Fixtures for the 2018–19 season were announced on 8 July 2018.

El Gouna, Nogoom and Haras El Hodoud entered as the promoted teams from the 2017–18 Egyptian Second Division. They replaced El Raja, Tanta and Al Nasr who were relegated to the 2018–19 Egyptian Second Division.

Defending champions Al Ahly won their 4th consecutive and 41st overall Egyptian Premier League title on 24 July 2019, following their 3–1 away win against Al Mokawloon Al Arab.

Overview

Fans return to the stadiums
From this season on, the Egyptian Football Association (EFA) officially allowed the fans to attend league matches again, after they showed great discipline while attending non-league matches in the previous years. The EFA banned all fans from attending all matches back in February 2012, where the Port Said Stadium riot occurred during Al Masry and Al Ahly match in the 2011–12 Egyptian Premier League, which resulted in the death of 72 Al Ahly fans, 1 Al Masry fan and 1 police officer. All Egyptian Premier League fixtures since then was played behind closed doors, and sometimes with a group of people who were invited by the clubs involving in a match.

Al Masry return to Port Said
From this season on, the Egyptian Football Association (EFA) was supposed to allow Al Masry to play all local home matches at Al Masry Club Stadium (previously known as Port Said Stadium) in Port Said, after the club successfully acquired the stadium from the Governorate of Port Said on 5 January 2016. However the local security authorities refused this decision, and the club ended up playing their home matches at various stadiums in different cities. The EFA banned Al Masry Club Stadium from hosting all football or sport activities after the Port Said Stadium riot occurred in 2012, and Al Masry played all of their local matches, both home and away, at Borg El Arab Stadium in Alexandria and at Ismailia Stadium in Ismailia for African matches since then.

Al Assiouty Sport takeover
On 18 June 2018, Mahmoud Al Assiouty, president of Al Assiouty Sport, announced that the club was officially sold to two investors from Saudi Arabia. The club name was changed to Pyramids Football Club, and the deal was later confirmed on 27 June 2018.

Nogoom El Mostakbal rebranding
On 29 July 2018, just two days before the start of the season, Nogoom El Mostakbal announced on their official Facebook page that the club name has been changed to Nogoom Football Club. Club president Mohamed El Tawila stated that the decision to rename the club came after they reached their goal by promoting to the Egyptian Premier League for the first time. The old name, Nogoom El Mostakbal, in Arabic, means "Future Stars", and the new name, Nogoom, means "Stars".

Teams

Eighteen teams competed in the league - the top fifteen teams from the previous season, and three teams promoted from the Second Division.

Teams promoted to the Egyptian Premier League
The first team to be promoted was Haras El Hodoud from Group C, following their 1–0 away win against Al Hammam on 10 April 2018. The Alexandrian side managed to return to the Premier League after staying only two season in the Second Division, and participated in the top flight for the fifteenth time in their history.

The second team to be promoted was El Gouna from Group A, following their 1–0 away win against Al Salam on 11 April 2018. El Gouna earned a spot in the Premier League for the fifth time in the club's history, having played four seasons in the top flight before with the 2014–15 season being the most recent.

The third team to be promoted was Nogoom (which was known as Nogoom El Mostakbal during that time) from Group B, following their 1–0 home win against Montakhab Suez on 18 April 2018. Nogoom managed to secure the promotion spot after a fierce contest that lasted until the last day of the league with Tersana, who lost 1–0 to Gomhoriat Shebin on the same day to confirm the promotion of Nogoom El Mostakbal to the Premier League for the first time in the club's history.

Teams relegated to the Egyptian Second Division
The first club to be relegated was Al Nasr, who suffered an immediate return to the Second Division following a 2–1 away defeat to Al Masry on 12 April 2018.

The second club to be relegated was Tanta, their stay in the Premier League came to an end after spending only two season in the top flight following a 1–2 home defeat to Al Masry on 21 April 2018.

The third club to be relegated was El Raja, who also suffered an immediate return to the Second Division after Wadi Degla managed to secure the last safe spot in the Premier League following a 2–1 home win against El Entag El Harby on 21 April 2018.

Venues

Notes

Personnel and kits

1. On the back of shirt.
2. On the sleeves.
3. Al Ahly used previous season's kits made by Sporta until January 2019.
4. Ismaily's captain, Hosny Abd Rabo, announced his retirement from football in January 2019.
5. Misr Lel Makkasa's captain, Mahmoud Wahid, transferred to Al Ahly during the winter transfer window.
6. Petrojet's captain, Shimelis Bekele, transferred to Misr Lel Makkasa during the winter transfer window.
7. Pyramids's captain, Hamada Tolba, transferred to Petrojet during the winter transfer window.
8. Wadi Degla's captain, El Sayed Salem, transferred to Al Ittihad during the winter transfer window.
9. Zamalek used previous season's kits made by Joma until October 2018.
 WE, Oppo, El Kasrawy Group, SAIB Bank, EgyptAir and GLC Paints are the league's main sponsors, and their logos are printed on most of the teams' kits.
 Additionally, referee kits are made by Adidas.

Managerial changes

Notes

Foreign players
Clubs can have a maximum of four foreign players registered during the season. Clubs cannot sign foreign players unless these players have played in the first or second tier in their countries. Clubs also cannot sign any foreign goalkeepers. In addition, each club can register a total of two players from Palestine or Syria; those players were be treated as Egyptians, and won't count as foreign players.

Players name in bold indicates the player is registered during the mid-season transfer window.
Players name in ITALICS indicates the player have left the club during the mid-season transfer window.

Results

League table

Positions by round
The table lists the positions of teams after each week of matches. In order to preserve chronological evolvements, any postponed matches were not included in the round at which they were originally scheduled, but added to the full round they were played immediately afterwards. For example, if a match was scheduled for matchday 13, but then postponed and played between days 16 and 17, it was added to the standings for day 16.
 

Source: Soccerway

Results table

Season statistics

Scoring
First goal of the season: Emmanuel Banahene for Al Ittihad against Al Mokawloon Al Arab (31 July 2018)
Last goal of the season: Ali Maâloul for Al Ahly against Zamalek (28 July 2019)

Top goalscorers

Notes

Hat-tricks

Note
(H) – Home ; (A) – Away

Top assists

Notes

Clean sheets

Monthly awards

Number of teams by governorate

References

1
 
Egyptian Premier League
Egypt